The Astoria 2, subsequently known as the LA2 then the Mean Fiddler, was a nightclub at 165 Charing Cross Road in London, England.

History
The venue was originally a ballroom in the basement of the London Astoria theatre and connected by stairways, so that the two venues could function as a single venue when needed. Like the Astoria, the venue was used for live music as well as night club promotions. At one point the venue was called Bang and was a gay nightclub.

A venue also called Mean Fiddler was previously set up in Harlesden, north west London in 1982.

In June 2006, the Mean Fiddler was sold — together with the London Astoria — to property group Derwent Valley Central, who planned to convert the site into a combination of shops and offices.

In January 2009, the property was compulsorily purchased for Crossrail. Astoria 2 had a closing party, headlined by rock band Open The Skies, with support from Outcry Fire, F.A.T.E and Orakai. The final club night PUSH was held the following day on 15 January 2009, with Cajun Dance Party and Good Shoes being the last acts to play at Astoria 2. The entire venue has now been demolished.

Recordings
Against Me! recorded their live album Americans Abroad!!! Against Me!!! Live in London!!! at the venue on 21 March 2006.
Enter Shikari recorded their three shows at the venue on 2, 3 and 4 November 2008. The DVD was released with a special edition of their second album Common Dreads.
Gaslight Anthem played at Astoria 2 on 5 December 2008, and a bootleg was made by fans.
Razorlight recorded 6 tracks at the FROG clubnight in 2004, which was released as a bonus DVD to their debut album, Up All Night.
Metallica played a secret gig in 1995 at Astoria 2. There was a limited CD release to fans.

References

External links
The Official Mean Fiddler Website

Nightclubs in London
Music venues in London
Buildings and structures in the City of Westminster
Defunct nightclubs in the United Kingdom
2009 disestablishments in the United Kingdom